Chromosome 9 open reading frame 43 is a protein that in humans is encoded by the C9orf43 gene. The gene is also known as  MGC17358 and LOC257169.  C9orf43 contains DUF 4647 and a polyglutamine repeat region although protein function is not well understood.

Gene

Location 

C9orf43 is located on the long arm of chromosome 9 at 9q32 and is expressed on the positive strand. The genomic sequence starts at 113,410,054 bp and ends at 113,429,684 bp.  The gene neighborhood of C9orf43 contains 5 other genes: HDHD3, ALAD, POLE3, RGS3, and LOC105376222.

Promoter 

The promoter region of C9orf43 predicted by Genomatix ElDorado is 1199 base pairs long and contains a CpG island and part of the 5' UTR. Transcription factor binding sites determined include zinc finger protein GC-Box factors SP1/GC and HOX-PBX complexes associated with development.

Expression pattern 

C9orf43 gene expression is relatively high in humans, 0.7 times the average gene.  C9orf43 is expressed in many different tissues during the fetal and adult developmental stages according to NCBI's EST Profile.  The highest expression is seen in the testes with lower relative expression in the umbilical cord, cervix, and brain.  Expression is also seen in the fetal liver, lung, liver, brain, heart, spinal cord, pancreas, thymus, salivary gland and placenta.

C9orf43 is expressed in health states including cervical tumors, normal tumors, and soft tissue/muscle tumors.  C9orf43 is expressed at high levels in sperm cells compared to lower relative expression in teratozoospermia.  Greater relative expression of C9orf43 is seen in the hyperplastic enlarged lobular unit of the mammary gland as compared to the normal terminal duct lobular unit.  C9orf43 expression varies in megakaryocyte differentiation as seen in peripheral blood CD34 plus cells as compared to CHRF-288-11 cells.

mRNA

Variants 
C9orf43 contains 10 alternatively spliced mRNAs, 8 of which encode good proteins.  The mRNA discussed in this entry has accession number NM_001278629.1 and differs from other mRNA variants in truncation of 5' and 3' ends and inclusion or exclusion of the six cassette exons.

Transcriptional regulation 
376 bp of C9orf43 are antisense to spliced gene POLE3, indicating possible regulation of alternate expression.  A short open reading frame upstream of the main open reading frame may reduce efficiency of translation.  The 3’ untranslated region of C9orf43 contains 3 predicted stem -loop structures with 4 miRNA predicted to bind.

Protein

Characteristics and Isoforms 
C9orf43 has three known complete isoforms and four partial isoforms. Isoform X1 with accession number NP_001265558.1 is the isoform discussed in this entry and contains 461 amino acids and 16 exons.  Isoform X1 has a predicted molecular weight of 52.2kD and a predicted isoelectric point of 8.037.  Isoform X1 protein abundance is predicted to be normal with normal expression.

Structure 
Composition analysis of C9orf43 showed an above average frequency of Glutamine while all other amino acids were in the normal range for human proteins.  DUF4647, a domain of unknown function, is present from amino acid 1-454.  Globular domains are predicted from amino acid 193-361 and 375-461.  C9orf43 secondary structure is predicted to be 36% alpha helical and 3% beta sheet with 73% disordered.  Secondary structure predictions are conserved in orthologous proteins.

Homology / Evolution 
C9orf43 has no known paralogs but has orthologs ranging from mammalian orders to reptile Crocodylus porosus.  No orthologs have been found in invertebrate or plant species.  C9orf43 divergence is moderate based on the molecular clock hypothesis.  C9orf43 is seen to diverge more quickly than cytochrome c but slower than fast evolving fibrinopeptides. A table of orthologous proteins constructed using BLAST contains a small subset of orthologs to exhibit the diversity of C9orf43.

Post Translational Modification 

SUMOylation, O-linked glycosylation, N-acetylgluocose addition, and phosphorylation are predicted post translational modifications of C9orf43.

Subcellular Localization 
C9orf43 is predicted to be intracellular with a nuclear localization signal that is conserved across orthologs.  The protein does not contain signal peptides or mitochondrial targeting signals indicating the protein is not predicted to be secreted or targeted to the mitochondria.

Interacting Proteins 
Predicted C9orf43 interaction with OR7D2 and OR4X2 olfactory receptors is likely as olfactory associated zinc finger protein is predicted to bind to the C9orf43 upstream promoter.  Predicted interaction of C9orf43 with CATSPER3, a sperm associated voltage gated calcium channel, is also likely as C9orf43 is highly expressed in sperm.

Clinical Significance 
C9orf43 has no known disease associations, however the polyglutamine repeat region is similar to genetic precursors in trinucleotide repeat disorders.  An increase in the length of the polyglutamine repeat region is seen in diseases such as Huntington's disease and Spinocerebellar ataxia.

References

Further reading